Winchcombe School is a mixed secondary school located in Winchcombe in the English county of Gloucestershire.

Previously a foundation school administered by Gloucestershire County Council, Winchcombe School was converted to academy status on 1 June 2011. However the school continues to coordinate with Gloucestershire County Council for admissions.

References

External links
Winchcombe School official website

Secondary schools in Gloucestershire
Academies in Gloucestershire
Winchcombe